Joseph Lyu or Lyu Jye-cherng (born 15 December 1956) is a Taiwanese business executive and politician.

Education
Lyu attended National Chengchi University and Northwestern University.

Career
Lyu worked for BNP Paribas and the Bank of New York Mellon, among other institutions. In July 2000, while serving as the vice president of KBC Bank in Taiwan, he accepted an appointment to the China Airlines board of directors. By 2002, Lyu was the vice chairman of the Commission of National Corporations, a division of the Ministry of Economic Affairs. In this position, he acted as the commission's spokesman, announcing several moves involving state-owned enterprises. Lyu was named to the board of the China Aviation Development Foundation (CADF) in June 2002. At the time, CADF held a majority of shares in China Airlines. After Mao Chi-kuo stepped down as chairman of Chunghwa Telecom in January 2003, Lyu was considered a potential successor. However, Lyu remained at the Commission of National Corporations for a time. Later that year, Lyu left both the Commission of National Corporations and China Airlines. In June 2004, Lyu succeeded Chen Mu-tsai as chairman and president of the Bank of Taiwan. Concurrently, Lyu also served on an economic advisory committee led by Lin Hsin-i. During his tenure, the merger of the Bank of Taiwan with the Central Trust of China was approved.

In January 2006, Lyu was appointed finance minister, replacing Lin Chuan. Lyu took office on 25 January 2006.  Lyu left the cabinet in September to chair King's Town Bank.  In January 2008, Lyu became the chairman of Mega Financial Holding Company. Wang Rong-jou replaced Lyu in July. In August 2016, Lyu was named to a government taskforce convened to probe the New York branch of Mega International Commercial Bank. Later, Lyu returned to Taiwan Financial Holding, and the Bank of Taiwan as chairman.

References

1956 births
Living people
Taiwanese Ministers of Finance
Taiwanese bankers
Bank presidents and chief executive officers
National Chengchi University alumni
Northwestern University alumni